The bathyal swimming crab, Bathynectes longispina, is a species of crab in the family Polybiidae.

It appears similar to other members of the portunid family, but has reduced swimming dactyls and long walking legs. As an adaptation to deep water, it has large eyes.

References

Portunoidea
Crabs of the Atlantic Ocean
Crustaceans described in 1879